Sunny Dhinsa (born May 20, 1993) is a Canadian professional wrestler and former amateur wrestler. He is best known for his time with the WWE, where he performed under the ring name Akam.

After signing with WWE in 2014, he has since teamed with Rezar as part of The Authors of Pain, with whom he has held the NXT Tag Team Championship and WWE Raw Tag Team Championship once, and they also won the 2016 Dusty Rhodes Tag Team Classic tournament.

Early life 
Sunny Dhinsa was born on May 20, 1993, in Abbotsford, British Columbia.

Amateur wrestling career 

Dhinsa attended Simon Fraser University, where he was a standout collegiate wrestler. He won the Canadian national freestyle wrestling champion in 2011, 2012 and 2013 in the heavyweight category. He won a gold medal in the 115 kg category at the 2009 Canada Summer Games, and a silver medal at the 2011 Pan American Games in Guadalajara. Dhinsa competed in the qualification tournament for the 2012 Summer Olympics, missing out on qualification after losing to Dremiel Byers. He was considered a prospect for the 2016 Summer Olympics but left amateur wrestling after being offered a contract with WWE in 2014, having been scouted for the company by Gerald Brisco.

Professional wrestling career

WWE (2014–2020)

In October 2014, Dhinsa was reported to have signed a contract with WWE and would begin training to become a professional wrestler at the WWE Performance Center. He made his in-ring debut at a NXT house show in Orlando, Florida on April 4, 2015, competing in a battle royal, which was won by Scott Dawson. By February 2016 Dhinsa had formed a tag team with Gzim Selmani and they became known as the Authors of Pain in April 2016.

Dhinsa and Selmani (billed as Akam and Rezar) made their televised NXT debuts on June 8, 2016, at NXT TakeOver: The End; following the NXT Tag Team Championship match, they attacked former champions American Alpha (Chad Gable and Jason Jordan) before being joined on stage by veteran manager Paul Ellering. The duo had a push during his time in NXT, winning the Dusty Rhodes Tag Team Classic, after defeating TM-61 at NXT TakeOver: Toronto and winning at NXT TakeOver: San Antonio the NXT Tag Team Championship when they defeated #DIY. The duo retained the titles at NXT TakeOver: Orlando (by defeating #DIY and The Revival in a triple threat tag team elimination match by eliminating both teams) and NXT TakeOver: Chicago (by defeating #DIY) in a ladder match to retain the titles. The duo turned face on August 9 edition of NXT after being attacked by SAnitY. At NXT TakeOver: Brooklyn III, the Authors of Pain lost the titles to SAnitY at NXT TakeOver: WarGames, Authors of Pain and Roderick Strong competed in a 3 team WarGames match which was won by The Undisputed Era. At NXT TakeOver: Philadelphia, Authors of Pain got a rematch but failed to win back the titles. At NXT TakeOver: New Orleans, Authors of Pain competed in a Triple threat tag team match for the NXT Tag Team Championship and Dusty Rhodes Tag Team Classic trophy which was won by The Undisputed Era (Adam Cole and Kyle O'Reilly).

On the April 9 episode of Raw, The Authors of Pain, along with Ellering, made their main roster debut, defeating Heath Slater and Rhyno. After the match, Akam and Rezar ended their partnership with Ellering by pushing him away and leaving him ringside as they returned backstage. On the September 3 episode of Raw, The Authors of Pain, now under the shortened name of "AOP", were accompanied to the ring by the 205 Live General Manager, Drake Maverick, who announced himself as their new manager.

On the November 5 episode of Raw, The Authors of Pain defeated Seth Rollins in a handicap match to win the Raw Tag Team Championship for the first time. They went on to defeat SmackDown's Tag Team Champions Cesaro and Sheamus in an interbrand Champion vs Champion match at Survivor Series. They lost the titles to Bobby Roode and Chad Gable on the December 10 episode of Raw.  In January 2019 Akam suffered an undisclosed leg injury that reportedly would keep him out for "at least a few months". He would be cleared to return to action in May, however the team has yet to return to action. He and Rezar returned to action at Super ShowDown on June 7, 2019.

In September 2019, AOP began appearing in vignettes, warning of their return. During the 2019 WWE Draft in October, AOP went undrafted, becoming free agents and able to choose which brand to sign with. Three days after the draft's conclusion, AOP signed with Raw, remaining on the brand. Then, they started allying with Seth Rollins after they helped beat down Kevin Owens on the Raw after Survivor Series (2019). In March 2020, it was reported that Rezar suffered a bicep injury, therefore putting the team on hiatus. Akam was last seen in WWE on the April 1 taping of Main Event, where he escorted Murphy to the ring for a match. On September 4, 2020, AOP were released from their WWE contracts.

Independent circuit (2022–present) 
In May 2022, Sunny Dhinsa and Gzim Selmani, now known as Legion of Pain, have announced the launch of their professional wrestling promotion, Wrestling Entertainment Series (WES).

Other media 
Akam made his video game debut as a playable character in WWE 2K18 and has since appeared in WWE SuperCard, WWE Champions, WWE 2K19, WWE 2K20. He and Rezar were announced as part of the DLC roster for WWE 2K Battlegrounds, but were later removed from the game after their release from WWE two weeks prior.

Championship and accomplishments 
 Pro Wrestling Illustrated
 Ranked No. 204 of the top 500 wrestlers in the PWI 500 in 2018
 WWE
 NXT Tag Team Championship (1 time) – with Rezar
 WWE Raw Tag Team Championship (1 time) – with Rezar
 Dusty Rhodes Tag Team Classic (2016) – with Rezar

References

External links

 
 

1993 births
Living people
Canadian male professional wrestlers
Canadian male sport wrestlers
Sportspeople from Abbotsford, British Columbia
Professional wrestlers from British Columbia
Wrestlers at the 2011 Pan American Games
Pan American Games medalists in wrestling
Pan American Games silver medalists for Canada
Medalists at the 2011 Pan American Games
NXT Tag Team Champions
Canadian sportspeople of Indian descent
21st-century professional wrestlers